Chen Qiang may refer to:

 Chen Qiang (actor) (1918–2012), Chinese actor and comedian
 Chen Qiang (general) (born 1956), Chinese major general